The 2016 Missouri Valley Conference women's soccer tournament is the postseason women's soccer tournament for the Missouri Valley Conference to be held from October 30 to November 6, 2016. The five match tournament will be held at campus sites, with the semifinals and final held at Adelaide Street Field in Normal, Illinois. The six team single-elimination tournament will consist of three rounds based on seeding from regular season conference play. The Evansville Purple Aces are the defending tournament champions after defeating the Loyola Ramblers in a penalty kick shootout in the championship match.

Bracket

Schedule

First Round

Semifinals

Final

References 

Missouri Valley Conference Women's Soccer Tournament
2016 Missouri Valley Conference women's soccer season